Nine Eyes or 9-Eyes may refer to:

 Nine Eyes (signals intelligence), an enlargement of the Five Eyes countries
 Intelligence School 9 (also known as Nine Eyes), a part of the British Government which recruited Christiaan Lindemans
 Mataiva ("Nine Eyes" in Tuamotuan), a coral atoll

Arts and entertainment
 "Nine Eyes", a song on the album I See Seaweed by The Drones
 "9-Eye", a pre-show of the film The Timekeeper
 "9-Eyes", an exhibition of Google Street View images by Jon Rafman